The Tsetsaut language is an extinct Athabascan language formerly spoken by the now-extinct Tsetsaut in the Behm and  Portland Canal area of Southeast Alaska and northwestern British Columbia. Virtually everything known of the language comes from the limited material recorded by Franz Boas in 1894 from two Tsetsaut slaves of the Nisga'a, which is enough to establish that Tsetsaut formed its own branch of Athabaskan.  It is not known precisely when the language became extinct. One speaker was still alive in 1927.  The Nisga'a name for the Tsetsaut people is "Jits'aawit"

The Tsetsaut referred to themselves as the Wetaŀ.

Examples 
The examples by Merritt Ruhlen:

Bibliography

 Boas, Franz, and Pliny Earle Goddard (1924) "Ts'ets'aut, an Athapascan Language from Portland Canal, British Columbia." International Journal of American Linguistics, vol. 3, no. 1, pp. 1–35.
 Collison, W. H. (1915) In the Wake of the War Canoe: A Stirring Record of Forty Years' Successful Labour, Peril and Adventure amongst the Savage Indian Tribes of the Pacific Coast, and the Piratical Head-Hunting Haida of the Queen Charlotte Islands, British Columbia.  Toronto: Musson Book Company.  Reprinted by Sono Nis Press, Victoria, B.C. (ed. by Charles Lillard), 1981.
 Dangeli, Reginald (1999) "Tsetsaut History: The Forgotten Tribe of Southern Southeast Alaska."  In: Alaska Native Writers, Storytellers & Orators: The Expanded Edition, ed. by Ronald Spatz, Jeane Breinig, and Patricia H. Partnow, pp. 48–54.  Anchorage: University of Alaska.

References

External links
First Nations Languages of British Columbia page
OLAC resources in and about the Tsetsaut language

Extinct languages of North America
Northern Athabaskan languages
North Coast of British Columbia
Languages extinct in the 20th century
20th-century disestablishments in North America